Ioana Ignat (born July 22, 1998, in Botoșani, Romania) is a Romanian singer who became known through her participation in Vocea României.

Career
Ioana Ignat's first single, "Ma dezindragostesc", released in February, 2017, became, in the blink of an eye, #2 on YouTube Trending and it entered the Radio's Playlists.

May 2017 - The song "Doar pe a ta" became, very fast, the No. 1 most streamed song on TV and Radio, and was the biggest hit of 2017 spending the most time on Shazam Romania Top.

Also in 2017, Ioana Ignat dropped a new song called "Nu ma uita". In a short amount of time, it became the most popular song on the online platforms (almost 60 million views on YouTube).

In 2018, Ioana released "In palma ta", a song that, again, in a short amount of time, became No. 1 on Radio and TV Streaming Top.  Today, her song, is still the most streamed song on TV and Radio.

During 2018 and 2019, Ioana Ignat had a lot of collaborations with different artists and had multiple singles: "Muritor", "De Dragul Iubirii", "Nu mai e", "Cand lumea e rea" (Dorian Popa),
"Much Better" (Super Monkeys), "Vivere" (Havana), "Lacrima" (Tudor Monroe),
"Te Sarut" (Pavel Stratan), "Dor De Noi" (Shift), "Asa-mi vine" (What's Up), "Ca Nebunii" (Speak).

Discography

Singles

References

1998 births
Living people
People from Botoșani
21st-century Romanian women singers
21st-century Romanian singers
Singing talent show contestants